Earl B. Hailston (born May 27, 1947) is a retired Marine Corps lieutenant general. He was Commanding General of United States Marine Corps Forces Pacific, U.S. Marine Forces Central Command, and U.S. Marine Corps Bases Pacific.

Early career
Hailston began his career in the Marine Corps as an enlisted infantry rifleman in 1967.  After completing boot camp, he reported to the 2nd Marine Division for duty as an infantry rifleman. Shortly after, Hailston entered the Enlisted Commissioning Program and received his commission in 1968. After completing The Basic School, Hailston received assignment as a rifle platoon commander with India Company "I", 3rd Battalion, 27th Marines.

Vietnam Service
From July 1969 to January 1971, Hailston served in the Republic of Vietnam assigned to the 1st Reconnaissance Battalion 1st Marine Division.

Later career
He attended flight training in Pensacola, Florida, receiving his wings in June 1973.

Other training schools attended include Amphibious Warfare School and the Air Command And Staff College.  He earned his bachelor's degree from Troy State University.

In May 1994, Hailston was promoted to the rank of brigadier general and was commander of the 3rd Force Service Support Group, FMF, Pacific, Okinawa, Japan. Further commands included:

July 1996 – Assistant Deputy Chief of Staff, Installations and Logistics (Facilities), Headquarters, U.S. Marine Corps, Washington, D.C.
March 1997 to June 1999 – Promotion to major general U.S. Pacific Command Director of Strategic Plans and Policy (J-5).
June 1999 – III Marine Expeditionary Force and Marine Corps Bases Japan.  Promotion to lieutenant general in June 1999.
August 2001 to retirement – Component Commander for the U.S. Pacific Command and U.S. Central Command.  In mid January 2002, General Tommy Franks forward deployed Hailston's command to Bahrain.

Okinawa Email controversy
While serving as commanding general of the III Marine Expeditionary Force, General Hailston drafted an email to 13 USMC officers in which he called the local Okinawa officials "all nuts and a bunch of wimps".  The email followed a January 2001 incident where a Marine was arrested for lifting up the dress of an Okinawan schoolgirl. Hailston later made an apology stating:
The message was an attempt, in a very emotional manner, to gain the strict attention of my commanders.  If my remarks in the e-mail are construed as suggesting anything else, then I am deeply sorry and apologize for the misunderstanding.

In retirement 
He serves as Chairman of the Air Warrior Courage Foundation.

Awards

References

External links
Official Biography for Earl B. Hailston

1947 births
Living people
United States Marine Corps personnel of the Vietnam War
Recipients of the Silver Star
Recipients of the Legion of Merit
Recipients of the Gallantry Cross (Vietnam)
United States Marine Corps generals
Recipients of the Defense Distinguished Service Medal